A bodkin point is a type of arrowhead. In its simplest form it is an uncomplicated squared metal spike, and was used extensively during the Middle Ages. Bodkin arrows complemented traditional broadhead arrows, as bodkin point arrows were designed to defeat mail armor while broadhead point arrows caused more serious wounds and tissue damage.

History 
Arrows of the long bodkin type were used by the Vikings and continued to be used throughout the Middle Ages. The bodkin point eventually fell out of use during the 16th and 17th centuries, as armour largely ceased to be worn and firearms took over from archery.

Armour penetration
It has been suggested that the bodkin came into its own as a means of penetrating armour, but research by the Royal Armouries has found no hardened bodkin points, though only two bodkin points were actually tested, not a statistically relevant number. Bodkins did, however, have greater ability to pierce mail armour than broadheads, and historical accounts do speak of bodkin arrows shot from close range piercing plate armour.

In a modern test, a direct hit from a steel bodkin point penetrated mail armour from a range of seven yards. However, the test was conducted without a padded jack or gambeson, which was layered cloth armour worn under heavier armour for protection against projectiles.

Armour of the medieval era was not completely proof against arrows until the specialised armour of the Italian city-state mercenary companies. Archery was thought not to be effective against plate armour in the Battle of Neville's Cross (1346), the Battle of Bergerac (1345), and the Battle of Poitiers (1356); such armour became available to European knights and men at arms of fairly modest means by the late 14th century, though never to all soldiers in any army.

Testing by Matheus Bane in 2006 and David Jones in 2014 demonstrated that a bodkin point arrow fired from longbow of ~75 pound draw weight at a distance of 10 yards could penetrate both gambeson and mail armor. In addition, Bane's testing demonstrated that a bodkin point arrow would also be able to penetrate plate armor of minimum thickness (1.2 mm), although likely not lethally. However, the arrowheads used in the Bane test were made of steel, while research by the Royal Armouries and the Historical Metallurgy Society suggests that a majority of medieval arrowheads were made from wrought iron instead.

The depth of penetration would be slight at that range but would increase as the range closed or against armour lesser than the best quality available at the time.

In August 2019, the YouTube channel 'Tod's Workshop', together with historian Tobias Capwell (curator at the Wallace collection), Joe Gibbs (archer), Will Sherman (fletcher), and Kevin Legg (armourer) ran a practical test using a reproduction of a 15th century plate breastplate over a chainmail and gambeson against a 160 lbf (710 N) longbow. Both wrought iron and case hardened arrows were fired at the target from a distance of 25 meters. In contrast to the earlier computer analysis, neither arrow type successfully penetrated the breastplate.

References

External links
 Making a Bodkin
 Mary Rose historical ship.
 Royal Armouries arrow research.

Archery
Projectiles